The Nicki Wrld Tour was a concert tour by US rappers Nicki Minaj and Juice Wrld. The European trek supported of Minaj's fourth studio album, Queen (2018), and Juice Wrld's second studio album, Death Race for Love (2019). The tour began on February 21, 2019, in Munich, Germany at Olympiahalle and concluded on March 28, 2019, in Geneva, Switzerland at SEG Geneva Arena, consisting of 19 shows. Three out of the original 40 shows were cancelled because of technical and weather issues. The tour was originally titled the NickiHndrxx Tour with Future and include a North American leg which was set to kick off in 2018. Juice Wrld was later announced as the replacement for Future as the co-headliner. In her initial statement on the postponed tour, Minaj stated that the North American tour would be postponed until May 2019, but rescheduled dates were never announced. Minaj stated that since her album Queen was pushed back, she did not have enough time to rehearse for the American leg.

Background 
During an interview on Beats 1 Radio in April 2018, Minaj announced the release date of her fourth studio album Queen, as well as touring plans. The NickiHndrxx Tour was officially announced in June of the same year, with co-headliner Future. The tour was set to begin in early September, but the North American leg was later postponed as Minaj "decided to re-evaluate elements of production". In December 2018, Minaj announced that co-headliner Future withdrew, and was replaced by American rapper Juice Wrld, and that the tour could commence in Europe.

Set list 
This set list is representative of the show in Munich, on February 21, 2019. It is not representative of all concerts for the duration of the tour.

 "Majesty"
 "Hard White"
 "Feeling Myself"
 "Only"
 "Truffle Butter"
 "Did It On'em"
 "Beez in the Trap"
 "Rake It Up" 
 "Dance (A$$)" 
 "Big Bank"
 "Fefe"
 "Anaconda"
 "Roman's Revenge"
 "Up All Night"
 "Throw Sum Mo" 
 "Plain Jane"
 "Itty Bitty Piggy"
 "Your Love"
 "Make Me Proud"
 "Monster"
 "Armed and Dangerous"
 "Black & White"
 "Lean wit Me"
 "All Girls Are the Same"
 "Fine China"
 "Wasted"
 "Robbery"
 "Lucid Dreams"
 "Turn Me On"
 "Whip It"
 "Pound the Alarm"
 "Starships"
 "Where Them Girls At"
 "All Things Go"
 "Save Me"
 "Right Thru Me"
 "Come See About Me"
 "Grand Piano"
 "Bed" / "Side to Side" 
 "Swalla"
 "Chun-Li"
 "Moment 4 Life"

Encore
 "The Night Is Still Young" (Interlude)
 "Super Bass"

Notes 
 During the shows in London, Birmingham and Manchester, Stylo G, Ms Banks and Lisa Mercedez joined Minaj on stage for performances, respectively.
 During the show in London, Minaj performed "Coco Chanel" and Yxng Bane joined her on stage to perform "Rihanna".
 During the Birmingham and Manchester shows, Lady Leshurr joined Minaj on stage to perform "Queen's Speech".

Shows

Cancelled shows

References 



2019 concert tours
Nicki Minaj concert tours
Co-headlining concert tours